Ceroxys confusa is a species of ulidiid or picture-winged fly in the genus Ceroxys of the family Ulidiidae.

Distribution
C. confusa has been recorded in Iran, and in the Arabian peninsula.

References

confusa
Insects described in 1912